Calamagrostis hirta is a species of grass in the family Poaceae.

It is a bunchgrass that is endemic to Ecuador.  It is an IUCN Red List Vulnerable species.

References

hirta
Bunchgrasses of South America
Endemic flora of Ecuador
Vulnerable flora of South America
Taxonomy articles created by Polbot